Events in the year 1951 in Norway.

Incumbents
 Monarch – Haakon VII
 Prime Minister – Einar Gerhardsen (Labour Party) until 9 November, Oscar Torp (Labour Party)

Events
 19 November – Torp's Cabinet is appointed.
 Norsk Hydro opens a PVC plant at Herøya.
 Municipal and county elections are held throughout the country.

Popular culture

Sports

Music

Film

Literature
Gunvor Hofmo, writer and poet, is awarded the Gyldendal's Endowment literature prize for the first time.
Ola Viker makes his literary debut with the novel Gullskoen.

Notable births

23 January – Dan Børge Akerø, television personality
1 February – Ellen Horn, actress, politician and Minister
24 February – Erna Osland, children's writer.
1 March – Berit Oskal Eira, politician
16 March – Oddvar Brå, cross-country skier, world champion.
19 March – Vegard Bye, politician
22 March – Stein Kåre Kristiansen, journalist
29 March 
Elisabeth Røbekk Nørve, politician
Hans-Wilhelm Steinfeld, journalist
13 April – Kaci Kullmann Five, politician and Minister
14 April – Terje Tysland, singer, songwriter.
26 April – Tor Bomann-Larsen, writer and illustrator.
13 May – Wenche Lyngholm, politician
2 June – Marianne Borgen, politician.
5 June – Sigrun Eng, politician
9 June – Geir Bøhren, composer
17 June – Sissel Buchholdt, handball player.
25 July – Hans O. Felix, trade unionist
4 August – Per Knutsen, writer and playwright (died 2022).
13 August – Barry Gjerde, translator and voice actor
20 August – Helge Torvund, writer.
21 August – Cecilie Løveid, writer.
7 September – Kari Lise Holmberg, politician
11 September – Odd Reitan, merchant.
2 November – John Olav Egeland, journalist and editor
8 December – Jan Eggum, singer-songwriter
8 November – Heidi Larssen, politician
2 December – Anne Berit Andersen, politician
12 December – Erik Hillestad, record producer.
15 December – Bente Angell-Hansen, diplomat
17 December – Sylvi Graham, politician
30 December – Trond Fevolden, civil servant

Notable deaths
14 January – Tor Jonsson, author and journalist (born 1916)
21 January – Erik Ramstad, one of the founders of Minot, North Dakota (born 1860)
23 March – Johan Henrik Wiers-Jenssen, newspaper columnist and theatre director (born 1897)
24 March – Anton Djupvik, politician (born 1881)
6 April – Halfdan Cleve, composer (born 1879)
9 April – Vilhelm Bjerknes, physicist and meteorologist (born 1862)
4 June – Lauritz Wigand-Larsen, gymnast and Olympic silver medallist (born 1895)
10 June – Håkon Evjenth, jurist and children's writer (born 1894).
19 June – Ivar Kirkeby-Garstad, politician and Minister (born 1877)
4 July – Anton Berge, agronomist and politician (born 1892)
17 September  – Jon Skeie, jurist (born 1871).
6 October – Olav Kringen, newspaper editor (born 1867).
14 October – Anton Johnson Brandt, veterinarian (born 1893)
18 December – Arthur Olsen, boxer (born 1900)
28 December – Nils Opdahl, gymnast and Olympic gold medallist (born 1882).

Full date unknown
Lars Olai Meling, politician and Minister (born 1876)
Gustav Smedal, jurist and irredentist activist (born 1888)

See also

References

 
Norway
Norway